Zeta Indi is a single star in the southern constellation Indus, near the northern constellation border with Microscopium. It is visible to the naked eye as a faint, orange-hued star with an apparent visual magnitude of 4.90. The star is located approximately 430 light years away from the Sun based on parallax. The radial velocity estimate for this object is poorly constrained, but it appears to be moving closer at the rate of around −5 km/s.

This object is an aging giant star with a stellar classification of K5III. With the supply of hydrogen at its core exhausted, the star has expanded off the main sequence and now has 45 times the girth of the Sun. It is radiating 446 times the luminosity of the Sun from its bloated photosphere at an effective temperature of 3,963 K.

References

K-type giants
Indus (constellation)
Indi, Zeta
Durchmusterung objects
198048
102790
7952